Edwin Cord is a fictional character appearing in American comic books published by Marvel Comics.

Publication history
Edwin Cord was created by David Michelinie and Frank Miller and first appeared in Daredevil #167 (November 1980).

Fictional character biography
The Head of the Cord Conglomerate, Edwin Cord is a well-connected yet frustrated businessman. He first appeared as the target of Aaron Soames using the stolen Mauler armor from Cord Conglomerate and planning to get revenge on Edwin for interference. This was thwarted by Daredevil which ended with Aaron being killed by Cord's men using advanced weapons to open fire on Mauler.

From his palatial estate on the East Coast, he plotted to bring down Tony Stark's companies on a regular basis. Tony Stark first encountered Cord at the Conclave of Electronics Engineers and Innovators in Dallas Texas where representatives from Roxxon Oil Corporation, S.H.I.E.L.D., and Cross Technological Enterprises. Cord hired the Raiders to take on Iron Man. He returned with the Raiders in an attempt to destroy the newly formed Stark Enterprises. After the Raiders were defeated, Cord shows a film of their exploits to S.H.I.E.L.D. to try to get the weapons contract formerly offered to Stark. S.H.I.E.L.D. is unimpressed by Cord's illegal means and Cord is arrested by the S.H.I.E.L.D. agents.

While in prison, Edwin hires Brendan Doyle to infiltrate Stark Enterprises and steal the Mauler armor to destroy Iron Man's armor design's records and histories, but Cord was thwarted by Jim Rhodes.

During the Armor Wars storyline, Cord was released from prison where he, Senator Boynton, and General Meade were overseeing Jack Taggert operating the Firepower armor which Cord's company created. The three watch as Firepower completes training, managing to defeat a bunch of jets and tanks. As Firepower is training with Private Baskin and Corporal Winters, Cord is approached by Boynton and Meade where the two want Cord to hand over the Firepower armor to which Cord turns down. Cord says he'll reveal to the tabloids how the Firepower armor was conceived as a riot-control device and then has Taggart blow up the flatbed truck the two were going to use to take away the Firepower armor should Boynton and Meade try to take the Firepower armor. The two are cowed though Meade is very unhappy. Over the next few days, Cord and Firepower seem determined to sabotage Stark Enterprises. Cord and Firepower intimidate a manufacturing group into not accepting a contract bid and blow up a shipment for Acutech Research and Development (a subsidiary of Stark Enterprises). After more days of destruction and harassment, Cord and Firepower drive Stark Enterprises to the point where Tony "can’t afford to lose another account". Firepower arrives at the Stark Railyard, injuring Bill Segrist (who is in charge of the railyard) and gives Stark a message from Cord that says that he destroyed Iron Man and now plans to destroy the rest of the great Tony Stark’s life.

Cord would later go on to finance U.S. Agent and the Jury in a failed attempt to apprehend the Thunderbolts at the time when the group and Warren Worthington III were fighting Graviton.

Relatives
 Drexel Cord - An unspecified relation of Edwin Cord (perhaps the father of the family) who founded the Cord Corporation. He created the Demolisher to destroy Iron Man, but lost control of the robot and sacrificed his life to stop the Demolisher.
 Janice Cord - The daughter of Drexel Cord and the unspecified relative of Edwin Cord. She was killed during Iron Man's fight with Titanium Man and Crimson Dynamo.

In other media
The character was originally going to appear in the 2013 live-action film Iron Man 3 alongside another villain, Simon Krieger, but they were both replaced by Aldrich Killian (played by Guy Pearce).

References

External links
 Edwin Cord at Marvel Wiki
 Edwin Cord at Comic Vine
 Edwin Cord Edwin Cord at Iron Man Armory
 Janice Cord Janice Foswell at Iron Man Armory

Fictional business executives
Comics characters introduced in 1988
Characters created by John Romita Jr.
Characters created by David Michelinie
Marvel Comics characters
Characters created by Bob Layton